Major events of 2010 in Azerbaijan.

Incumbents
 President: Ilham Aliyev
 Prime Minister: Artur Rasizade

Events

January 

 January 20 - The opening of monumental complex to 20 January in Baku.

February
February 18 - Three Azerbaijani soldiers were killed and one wounded as a result of the 2010 Nagorno-Karabakh skirmish.
February 25 - Massachusetts State of the United States recognizes Khojaly massacre.

April
April 13 - 2010 European Wrestling Championships opened in Baku (ended on April 18).
April 25 - 2010 Youth World Amateur Boxing Championships opened in Baku (ended on May 3).

May
May 23 - The 2009–10 Azerbaijan Cup final between FK Baku and FK Khazar Lankaran took place in Baku.

October
October 26 - The eighteenth season of Azerbaijan Cup competitions was opened.

November
November 7 - 2010 parliamentary election was held.
November 19 - Two opposition bloggers, Adnan Hajizade and Emin Milli, were released from imprisonment.

References

 
Years of the 21st century in Azerbaijan
Azerbaijan
Azerbaijan
Azerbaijan
2010s in Azerbaijan